Patella caerulea, is a species of limpet in the family Patellidae. It is known by the common names Mediterranean limpet and rayed Mediterranean limpet. It is native to the Mediterranean Sea.

Description
The size of the shell varies between 20 mm and 72 mm.

The thin shell is depressed, spreading, usually more or less distinctly 6 or 7 angled. The riblets rather fine and notably unequal.

Distribution
This species occurs in the Mediterranean Sea; in the Atlantic Ocean off the Canary Islands, Madeira and the Azores.

References
 Linnaeus, C. (1758). Systema Naturae per regna tria naturae, secundum classes, ordines, genera, species, cum characteribus, differentiis, synonymis, locis. Editio decima, reformata. Laurentius Salvius: Holmiae. ii, 824 pp
 da Costa E.M., 1771: Conchology, or natural history of shells; London 26 pp., 12 pls.
 Gmelin J. F., 1791: Carli Linnaei systema Naturae per regna tria naturae. Editio decimatertia, aucta, reformata, Vermes Testacea Leipzig [Lipsiae] 1 (6): 3021-3910 
 Röding P. F., 1798: Museum Boltenianum sive Catalogus Cimeliorum e tribus regnis naturae quae olim collegerat Joa. Fried. Bolten M. D. p. d. pars secunda continens Conchylia sive Testacea univalvia, bivalvia et multivalvia pp. VIII + 199 
 Lamarck ([J.-B. M.] de), 1815-1822: Histoire naturelle des animaux sans vertèbres; Paris [vol. 5: Paris, Deterville/Verdière] [vol. 6 published by the Author] 7 vol. [I molluschi sono compresi nei vol. 5–7. Vol. 5 (Les Conchiferes): 612 pp. [25 luglio 1818]. Vol. 6 (1) (Suite): 343 pp. [1819]. Vol. 6 (2) (Suite): 232 pp. [1822]. Vol. 7: (Suite): 711 pp. [1822]] 
 Risso A., 1826-1827: Histoire naturelle des principales productions de l'Europe Méridionale et particulièrement de celles des environs de Nice et des Alpes Maritimes; Paris, Levrault Vol. 1: XII + 448 + 1 carta [1826]. Vol. 2: VII + 482 + 8 pl. (fiori) [novembre 1827]. Vol. 3: XVI + 480 + 14 pl. (pesci) [settembre 1827]. Vol. 4: IV + 439 + 12 pl. (molluschi) [novembre 1826]. Vol. 5: VIII + 400 + 10 pl. (altri invertebrati) [Novembre 1827] 
 Philippi R. A., 1836: Enumeratio molluscorum Siciliae cum viventium tum in tellure tertiaria fossilium, quae in itinere suo observavit. Vol. 1; Schropp, Berlin [Berolini] xiv + 267 p., pl. 1-12 
 Potiez V. L. V. & Michaud A. L. G., 1838-1844: Galerie des Mollusques ou catalogue méthodique, descriptif et raisonné des Mollusques et Coquilles du Muséum de Douai; Paris Vol. 1: pp. 560 + XXXV [1838]. Vol. 2: pp. XXXVI-XLIV + 305 [1844]. Atlante: pp. 79 + 70 pl.
 Anton H. E., 1839: Verzeichniss der Conchylien welche sich in der Sammlung von Hermann Eduard Anton befinden; Halle XVI + 110 p
 Nardo D., 1847: Sinonimia moderna delle specie registrate nell’opera intitolata: Descrizione de’Crostacei, de’Testacei e de’Pesci che abitano le Lagune e Golfo Veneto, rappresentati in figure, a chiaroscuro ed a colori dall' Abate Stefano Chiereghini Ven. Clodiense applicata per commissione governativa; Venezia pp. i-xi, 1-127
 Monterosato T. A. (di), 1888-1889: Molluschi del Porto di Palermo. Specie e varietà; Bullettino della Società Malacologica Italiana, Pisa 13 (1888[1889?]): 161-180 14 (1889): 75-81
 Locard A., 1892: Les coquilles marines des côtes de France; Paris, J.B. Baillière & fils pp. 384.

External links
 

Patellidae
Molluscs of the Mediterranean Sea
Marine molluscs of Africa
Marine molluscs of Europe
Gastropods described in 1758
Taxa named by Carl Linnaeus